Cashandra Slingerland (born 8 December 1974) is a road cyclist from South Africa. In 2009, she won the time trial at the African Cycling Championships.

References

External links
 profile at Procyclingstats.com

1974 births
South African female cyclists
Living people
Place of birth missing (living people)